Master: Piece is the fifth extended play by South Korean boy band Cravity. It was released on March 6, 2023, by Starship Entertainment and distributed by Kakao Entertainment. It was released alongside the music video for lead single "Groovy".

The album debuted at number two on the South Korean Circle Album Chart with sales of over 238,000 copies.

Background

The EP includes four songs co-written by members Serim and Allen, namely "Fly," "Get Lifted," and "Baddie," as well as the lead single, "Groovy." Member Woobin has also participated in the album through his second self-produced song, "Light the way." In addition, WJSN's Exy has also participated through the lyrics of "A to Z."

Promotion
On March 6, Cravity began the EP's promotion through a live comeback show with YouTube channel "Zanmang Loopy," entitled "CRAVITY COMEBACK SHOW in Jean Mang House." The group interacted through real-time communication with fans as well as discussing the EP's creation.

The group's promotion for the song "Groovy" on music show programs began on Mnet's M Countdown on March 9, 2023. The promotion continued on MBC's Music Core on March 11. Cravity also appeared on entertainment program "Weekly Idol" before capping off the first week of promotions through "Sunmi's Show! Interview."

Track listing

Charts

References

2022 EPs
Cravity EPs
Korean-language EPs